Daniel Klose (born 30 October 1979) is a professional German darts player who plays in Professional Darts Corporation events.

Career
Klose qualified for his first PDC European Tour tournament in 2019, when he qualified for the 2019 European Darts Grand Prix, but he lost in the first round to Keegan Brown. In 2023 Q-school of darts he won a ProTour card

References

External links

1979 births
Living people
German darts players
Professional Darts Corporation current tour card holders
People from Ansbach
Sportspeople from Middle Franconia